During World War II, the United States Army Air Forces (USAAF) established numerous airfields in Mississippi for antisubmarine defense in the Gulf of Mexico and for training pilots and aircrews of USAAF fighters and bombers.

Most of these airfields were under the command of Third Air Force or the Army Air Forces Training Command (AAFTC) (A predecessor of the current-day United States Air Force Air Education and Training Command).  However the other USAAF support commands (Air Technical Service Command (ATSC); Air Transport Command (ATC) or Troop Carrier Command operated a significant number of airfields in support roles.

It is still possible to find remnants of these wartime airfields. Many were converted into municipal airports, some were returned to agriculture and several were retained as United States Air Force installations and were front-line bases during the Cold War. Hundreds of the temporary buildings that were used survive today, and are being used for other purposes.

Major Airfields

Third Air Force
 Key Field, Meridian
 39th Army Air Force Base Unit
 Now:  Key Field Air National Guard Base

 Laurel Army Airfield, Laurel
 473d Base Headquarters and Air Base Squadron
 Assigned to Air Technical Service Command, (1944-1946)
 Now: Hesler-Noble Field

 Hattiesburg Army Airfield, Hattiesburg
 39th Army Air Force Base Unit
 Assigned to Air Technical Service Command, (1942-1945)
 Now: Hattiesburg Bobby L. Chain Municipal Airport

AAF Training Command

 Columbus Army Airfield, Columbus, Mississippi
 Southeast Training Center, 1941
 Eastern Flying Training Command
 30th (Advanced Twin-Engine) Flying Training Wing
 Now:  Columbus Air Force Base
 Known sub-bases and auxiliaries
 Columbus Auxiliary Field
 River Auxiliary Field
 Caledonia Auxiliary Field
 Waterworks Auxiliary Field
 Columbus Municipal Airport (Old)
 Vaughn Auxiliary Field 
 Stinson Auxiliary Field  
 Starkville Auxiliary Field

 Greenville Army Airfield, Greenville, Mississippi
 Southeast Training Center, 1941
 Army Air Forces Pilot Training School (Basic)
 74th Army Air Force Base Unit
 Assigned to Air Technical Service Command, (1945-1946)
 Was: Greenville Air Force Base (1950-1965)
 Contract Flying School* (1950-1953)
 3505th Pilot Training Wing (Basic, Single-Engine) (1953-1960)
 Technical Training Center (1960-1965)
 Now: Mid Delta Regional Airport
 Known sub-bases and auxiliaries
 Greenville Municipal Airport 
 Indianola Auxiliary Field 
 Walker Auxiliary Field

 Greenwood Army Airfield, Greenwood
 Eastern Flying Training Command
 Army Air Forces Flying School (Basic)
 7th Basic Flying Training Group
 Reassigned to Third Air Force (1945)
 Now: Greenwood-Leflore Airport
 Known sub-bases and auxiliaries
 Paynes Auxiliary Field
 Oxberry Auxiliary Field
 Avalon Auxiliary Field
 Curger Auxiliary Field
 Tchula Auxiliary Field
 Greenwood Municipal Airport

 Gulfport Army Airfield, Gulfport
 Headquarters, Eastern Technical Training Command
 Joint use with Third Air Force (1944-1945)
 Reopened as Gulfport Air Force Base (1951-1958)
 Headquarters, Technical Training Air Force also Contract Flying School 
 Now:  Gulfport Combat Readiness Training Center
 Known sub-bases and auxiliaries
 Gulfport Auxiliary Field
 Hancock County Airport

 Keesler Army Airfield, Biloxi
 Western Technical Training Command
 Basic Training and Technical Training Center
 Now:  Keesler Air Force Base

.* Greenville was designated as an "Air Base" by Air Training Command while operated as private contractor-operated training facilities in the 1950s.

AAF Contract Flying Schools

 Cleveland Army Airfield, Cleveland
 Eastern Flying Training Command
 Contract Flying School: Cleveland School of Aviation
 Now: Cleveland Municipal Airport

 Fletcher Field, Clarksdale
 2154th Air Base Unit
 Contract Flying School: Clarksdale School of Aviation
 Now: Fletcher Field
 Known sub-bases and auxiliaries
 Clarksdale Auxiliary Field
 Ellis Auxiliary Field

 Jackson Army Air Base, Jackson
 Contract Flying School: Mississippi Institute of Aeronautics
 35th Army Air Force Base Unit
 Now:  Jackson Air National Guard Base
 Known sub-bases and auxiliaries
 Augustine Auxiliary Field  
 Lee Auxiliary Field
 Ratiff Auxiliary Field
 Sutherland Auxiliary Field
 Forest Auxiliary Field
 Hinds County Airport  
 Lime Prairie Auxiliary Field

Troop Carrier Command
 Grenada Army Airfield, Grenada
 443d Air Force Base Unit
 Now: Grenada Municipal Airport

References
 Maurer, Maurer (1983). Air Force Combat Units Of World War II. Maxwell AFB, Alabama: Office of Air Force History. .
 Ravenstein, Charles A. (1984). Air Force Combat Wings Lineage and Honors Histories 1947-1977. Maxwell AFB, Alabama: Office of Air Force History. .
 Thole, Lou (1999), Forgotten Fields of America : World War II Bases and Training, Then and Now - Vol. 2.  Pictorial Histories Pub . 
 Military Airfields in World War II - Mississippi

External links

 01
World War II
United States World War II army airfields